The 1995–96 Honduran Liga Nacional season was the 30th edition of the Honduran Liga Nacional.  The format of the tournament remained the same as the previous season.  Club Deportivo Olimpia won the title after defeating Real C.D. España in the finals.  Both teams qualified to the 1997 CONCACAF Champions' Cup.

1995–96 teams

 Broncos
 Independiente Villela (promoted)
 Marathón
 Motagua
 Olimpia
 Platense
 Real España
 Real Maya
 Victoria
 Vida

Regular season

Standings

Final round

Hexagonal

 Motagua won 3–2 on aggregated.

 Real España won 1–0 on aggregated.

 Victoria won 2–0 on aggregated.

Triangular

Final
Played between winners of regular season and final round.

 Olimpia won 3–0 on aggregated.

Top scorer
  Geovanny Castro (Motagua) with 14 goals

Squads

Known results

Round 1

Unknown rounds

References

Liga Nacional de Fútbol Profesional de Honduras seasons
1995–96 in Honduran football
Honduras